Palmo may refer to: 

 Tenzin Palmo, Tibetan Buddhist nun 
 Sister Palmo, Tibetan Buddhist nun  
 Rocco Palmo, Catholic writer, columnist, and commentator 
 Palmo (unit of measurement), a Spanish anthropic unit of length